"Two Strong Hearts" is a song written by Andy Hill and Bruce Woolley. Australian singer John Farnham recorded the song and released it as the second single from his 13th studio album, Age of Reason (1988). The song peaked at number six on the Australian ARIA Singles Chart in October 1988. At the APRA Music Awards of 1990, the song won the Most Performed Overseas Work award.

"Two Strong Hearts" was also recorded as a duet with Johnny Mathis and Dionne Warwick on Mathis's studio album Once in a While, released in May 1988.

Track listing
 "Two Strong Hearts" – 3:35
 "It's a Long Way to the Top (If You Wanna Rock 'n' Roll)" – 4:11

Charts

Weekly charts

Year-end charts

References

John Farnham songs
1988 singles
1988 songs
APRA Award winners
Songs written by Andy Hill (composer)
Songs written by Bruce Woolley